Jörg Müller (born 1969) is a German racing driver.

Jörg Müller or Joerg Mueller may also refer to:
Jörg Müller (artist) (born 1942), Swiss artist who won the Hans Christian Andersen Award in 1994
Jörg Müller (cyclist) (born 1961), Swiss former road bicycle racer

See also
Disappearance of Jorge Müller and Carmen Bueno